Yogev Ben Simon (born 6 April 1986) is a former Israeli footballer.

External links 
 

1986 births
Israeli Jews
Living people
Israeli footballers
Hapoel Nir Ramat HaSharon F.C. players
Sektzia Ness Ziona F.C. players
Hakoah Maccabi Amidar Ramat Gan F.C. players
Hapoel Ramat Gan F.C. players
Hapoel Petah Tikva F.C. players
Hapoel Rishon LeZion F.C. players
Maccabi Sha'arayim F.C. players
Maccabi Kiryat Gat F.C. players
Israeli Premier League players
Liga Leumit players
Footballers from Rishon LeZion
Israeli people of Moroccan-Jewish descent
Association football fullbacks